Célio Luis da Sousa Bispo (born 7 October 1987 in Codó), commonly known as Célio Codó, is a Brazilian footballer, who plays as a forward for Iporá.

Career
In season 2009 Célio Codó scored 3 goals in four games for Sampaio Corrêa in the Campeonato Brasileiro Série C, but his team finished last in the group A and relegated to Série D. In the next year he scored 6 goals in 9 games for Sampaio Corrêa in the Série D. Following the 2010 Campeonato Maranhense in which Célio scored 4 goals, the club were crowned champions.

On 5 January 2011, he signed for Santo André on a four-month loan. Codó earned 11 appearances for the team in the Campeonato Paulista, scoring one goal in a 2–2 home draw against Oeste on 19 March. He also scored twice in the matches of the Copa do Brasil against Naviraiense and his previously team Sampaio Corrêa.

On 8 June 2011, Codó transferred to Bulgarian side Litex Lovech together with his Sampaio Corrêa teammate Thiago Miracema on a season-long loan. In 2016 he signed a contract with Vitória da Conquista, but saw limited playing time for the team.

Club statistics
Updated 1 December 2013

Honours

Club
Sampaio Corrêa
 Campeonato Maranhense (1): 2010

References

External links
 

1987 births
Living people
Brazilian footballers
Esporte Clube Santo André players
Al Dhaid SC players
PFC Litex Lovech players
Parauapebas Futebol Clube players
UAE First Division League players
Association football forwards
Expatriate footballers in Bulgaria
First Professional Football League (Bulgaria) players